A colossal bust of Abraham Lincoln was made by Gutzon Borglum and completed in 1908.  The original marble sculpture is installed in the United States Capitol crypt, in Washington, D.C.  Copies cast in bronze are installed in several other locations, including the Lincoln Tomb in Springfield, Illinois.

Marble original sculpture

Borglum made the original bust directly from Alabama marble without a prior plaster model, based on photographs and an 1860 life mask of Lincoln's face made by Leonard Volk.  The likeness was praised by Lincoln's son Robert Todd Lincoln in 1908: "I think it is the most extraordinarily good portrait of my father I have ever seen."

The distinctive face of Lincoln, without a beard, emerges from the rough rock, similar in style to sculptures by Michelangelo and Auguste Rodin, and also similar to Borglum's sculptures at Mount Rushmore, which includes a bearded Lincoln. Borglum also made a statue of Seated Lincoln, installed in Newark, New Jersey in 1911.

The sculpture was donated to Congress by the New York financier Eugene Meyer, Jr., as recorded on the marble pedestal also designed by Borglum on which the bust was installed in 1911.  For many decades it was displayed in United States Capitol rotunda, which still has a standing statue of Lincoln made by Vinnie Ream in 1871.  The bust was moved to the crypt below in 1979.

The bust is part of the United States Capitol art collection, but it is not one of the sculptures of the National Statuary Hall Collection.  Two other sculptures by Borglum are in the National Statuary Hall Collection: a statue of Alexander Hamilton Stephens and a statue of Zebulon Baird Vance.

Bronze casts

Borglum had intended the marble bust to remain a unique work of art, but a mold was later made which was used to cast several copies in bronze.  One cast stands in front of the Lincoln Tomb in Springfield, Illinois.  Others are in the collections of the Chicago Historical Society, the College of the City of New York, the University of California, Berkeley, and the White House. The bust in the White House was donated by Eugene Meyer in 1954, and is usually displayed on a stone pillar in the East Garden Room, which links the East Wing to the Executive Residence.  The patina has been rubbed off the noses of the busts at the Lincoln Tomb and at Shepherd Hall, CUNY, where they are often touched for good luck.  An example of a  bronze cast of Borglum's bust was sold in 2015 for $30,000.

See also

 1908 in art
 Art in the White House

References

External links
 

1908 establishments in Washington, D.C.
1908 sculptures
Abraham Lincoln in art
Art in the White House
Bronze sculptures in California
Bronze sculptures in Illinois
Bronze sculptures in New York City
Bronze sculptures in Washington, D.C.
Buildings and structures in Berkeley, California
Buildings and structures in Springfield, Illinois
Busts in California
Busts in Illinois
Busts in New York City
Busts in Washington, D.C.
Busts of presidents of the United States
Marble sculptures in Washington, D.C.
Monuments and memorials in California
Monuments and memorials in Illinois
Monuments and memorials in New York City
Monuments and memorials in Washington, D.C.
Sculptures of men in California
Sculptures of men in Illinois
Sculptures of men in New York City
Sculptures of men in Washington, D.C.
Sculptures by Gutzon Borglum
University of California, Berkeley